Tanumshede is a locality and the seat of Tanum Municipality in Västra Götaland County, Sweden with 1,697 inhabitants in 2010.

See also
 Rock Carvings in Tanum

References

External links 

Municipal seats of Västra Götaland County
Swedish municipal seats
Populated places in Västra Götaland County
Populated places in Tanum Municipality